The Langley Porter Psychiatric Institute (LPPI) is a psychiatric teaching hospital, part of the Psychiatry Department at the University of California, San Francisco.  It is located at 401 Parnassus Avenue at Hillway Avenue on the Parnassus campus of UCSF.

Langley Porter was the first psychiatric institute in California, and is the oldest facility of the UCSF Psychiatry Department.

History
The foundation stone of the hospital was laid in 1941. The hospital opened in 1942 with 100 beds, and was completed in 1943.  The hospital was first known by the name "Langley Porter Clinic", which later changed to the "Langley Porter Neuropsychiatric Institute", and later again to the present "Langley Porter Psychiatric Institute", or informally, "LPPI".

The LPPI became part of the medical center's accreditation in 1962.  It was named after Dr. Robert Langley Porter, a prominent and influential Dean of the UCSF.

The eminent psychologist Paul Ekman worked here from 1960 to 2004. Anthropologist Gregory Bateson and poet Weldon Kees also worked here in the 1950s with psychiatrist Jurgen Ruesch.

References
  136 pp.

External links
 
 
 

Hospitals in San Francisco
Psychiatric hospitals in California
Teaching hospitals in California
University of California, San Francisco
Hospital buildings completed in 1942
1941 establishments in California
Hospitals established in 1942